Asher Winkelstein (October 15, 1893 – May 30, 1972) was an American gastroenterologist who first described gastroesophageal reflux disease in 1935. He was a native of Syracuse, New York. He founded the gastroenterology clinic at Mount Sinai Hospital in Manhattan.

References

1893 births
1972 deaths
American gastroenterologists
People from Syracuse, New York
American Jews
American people of Polish-Jewish descent